Luckhoo is a surname. Notable people with the surname include: 

Edward Luckhoo (1912–1998), Guyanese politician
Lionel Luckhoo (1914–1997), Guyanese politician, diplomat, and lawyer

Surnames of Guyanese origin